Øvre Årdal is a village in Årdal Municipality in Vestland county, Norway. It is the larger of the two primary villages in Årdal.

Farnes Church is located in this village. The road Tindevegen goes from Øvre Årdal, through the Fardalen valley to the village of Turtagrø in Luster Municipality. It's one of the highest elevation roads in Norway. There is also a road which goes south past the lake Tyin to the European route E16 highway which goes through Valdres to Oslo.

Øvre Årdal is the starting point for tours into the nearby Utladalen Landscape Protection Area and Jotunheimen National Park. There are trips to the Utladalen and Avdalen valleys, to the mountain Falketind, to the Vettisfossen waterfall, and to the historic farms of Vetti, Vettismorki, and Avdalen.

Norsk Hydro has an aluminium smelting plant which is a major employer in the area.

Årdal FK is an association football club which plays at Jotun stadium in Øvre Årdal.

References

External links
 
 Årdal Sogelag 
 Porten.no 
 Tindevegen 

Monotowns in Norway
Årdal
Villages in Vestland